Evan Bates (born February 23, 1989) is an American ice dancer. With his skating partner, Madison Chock, he is a 2022 Olympic team event silver medalist, a three-time World medalist (silver in 2015, bronze in 2016 and 2022), a four-time Grand Prix Final silver medalist (2014–15, 2015–16, 2019–20, 2022–23), a three-time Four Continents champion (2019, 2020, 2023), and a four-time U.S. national champion (2015, 2020, 2022, 2023). The two represented the United States at the 2014, 2018 and 2022 Winter Olympics. 

With former partner Emily Samuelson, Bates is the 2009 Four Continents bronze medalist, the 2008 World Junior champion, and the 2009 U.S. national silver medalist. They competed at the 2010 Winter Olympics.

Personal life 
Evan Bates was born in Ann Arbor, Michigan. He graduated from Huron High School in 2007 and from the University of Michigan in December 2013 with a degree in Organizational Studies.

After partnering on ice for several years, Chock and Bates began a romantic relationship in 2017. On June 11, 2022 they became engaged.

Early career 
Evan Bates began skating at age four. He trained as a single skater and tested up to the Junior level in the USFSA testing structure; landing jumps through the double axle. He began training with ice dancing coaches Yuri Chesnichenko and Yaroslava Nechaeva after they moved to the United States.

First five seasons with Samuelson 
Bates teamed up with Emily Samuelson in May 2000 following the suggestion of one of their coaches, Gary Clark. After competing on the juvenile level for one season, they moved up a level and won the U.S. national intermediate title in the 2001–2002 season.

In 2002–2003, Samuelson/Bates moved up another level and competed internationally for the first time through the North American Challenge Skate program, placing 10th in the novice ranks at the event in Thunder Bay, Ontario. They did not qualify to the 2003 U.S. Championships but did qualify to the 2004 U.S. Championships, where they won the novice bronze medal. The duo then took the novice silver medal at the Estonia International Ice Dancing Championships. They would win the national novice title at the 2005 U.S. Championships.

2005–2006 season 
Samuelson/Bates moved up to the junior level. They debuted on the ISU Junior Grand Prix. At the 2005–06 ISU Junior Grand Prix event in Slovakia, they placed sixth in the compulsory dance, tenth in the original dance, and 6th in the free dance to place eighth overall. At the event in Sofia, Bulgaria, they placed fifth in all three segments of the competition and overall. They won their sectional championship to qualify for the 2006 U.S. Championships, where they won the silver medal on the junior level. This medal qualified them for a trip to the 2006 Junior Worlds, where they placed tenth.

2006–2007 season 
Samuelson/Bates remained on the junior level. They competed on the 2006–07 ISU Junior Grand Prix. At their event in Mexico, they won all three competition segments and the gold medal overall. At their event in Taipei, they placed second in the compulsory dance and won the original and free dances to win the gold medal overall. These medals qualified them for the Junior Grand Prix Final. At the Junior Grand Prix Final, they placed second behind training mates Hubbell/Hubbell. Qualifying for the Junior Grand Prix Final had given them a bye to the 2007 U.S. Championships. Competing again against the Hubbells, Samuelson/Bates won the junior national title. They were placed on the team to the 2007 World Junior Championships. At Junior Worlds, they were in second place going into the free dance. However, they were forced to withdraw from the competition in the middle of their free dance due to injury. Bates stepped on the back of Samuelson's hand after she fell shortly into the free dance, severing a tendon. Their withdrawal, combined with the placement of the other American teams, meant the U.S. would only have two entries to the 2008 Junior Worlds.

2007–2008 season 

Samuelson/Bates remained juniors internationally but moved up to seniors nationally. They began their season on the 2007–08 ISU Junior Grand Prix. Skating with a minor knee injury at their first Junior Grand Prix event in Lake Placid, Samuelson/Bates won all three segments of the competition to win the gold medal overall. At their second event, they won both the compulsory and original dances but placed second in the free dance to win the gold medal overall. These medals qualified them for the 2007–08 Junior Grand Prix Final and also earned them a bye to the 2008 U.S. Championships. At the Junior Grand Prix Final, they placed third in the compulsory dance and second in the original and free dances to win the silver medal overall.

At the U.S. Championships, Samuelson/Bates made their senior national debut. They placed fourth in the compulsory and original dances. In the free dance, Samuelson/Bates fell during a lift that had been inserted into the program for the senior program due to the different requirements between junior and senior-level free dances. They placed 6th in the free dance and won the pewter medal, continuing their medal streak at the U.S. Championships. Their placement at the U.S. Championships earned them a trip to the 2008 World Junior Championships. At Junior Worlds, they won all three competition segments and the title overall.

2008–2009 season: Bronze at Four Continents 
Making their senior international debut, Samuelson/Bates won gold at the 2008 Nebelhorn Trophy after placing second in the compulsory dance and first in the next two segments. They finished fourth in their senior Grand Prix debut at the 2008 Skate America. At their next Grand Prix event, the 2008 NHK Trophy, they won the bronze medal after placing third in the compulsory dance, fourth in the original dance, and fourth in the free dance.

At the 2009 U.S. Championships, they placed second in all three segments of the competition and won the silver medal overall. It was their sixth consecutive medal at the U.S. Championships. Due to their result, they were assigned to the 2009 Four Continents and the 2009 World Championships. At the Four Continents, they placed fourth in the compulsory dance and then third in the original and free dances to win the bronze medal overall. At Worlds, they placed thirteenth in the compulsory dance, eleventh in the original dance, and ninth in the free dance for an eleventh-place overall result.

2009–2010 season: 2010 Olympics 
Samuelson/Bates finished fifth at the 2009 Skate Canada International and fourth at the 2009 Trophee Eric Bompard. After taking the bronze medal at the 2010 U.S. Championships, they were named to the U.S. Olympic team. In February, they placed fourteenth in the compulsory dance, eleventh in the original dance, eleventh in the free dance, and eleventh overall at the 2010 Winter Olympics in Vancouver, Canada.

In March, Samuelson/Bates placed tenth in all segments but ninth overall at the 2010 World Championships in Turin, Italy. On April 28, 2010, they announced their decision to leave their long-time coaches, Yuri Chesnichenko and Yaroslava Nechaeva, to train with Igor Shpilband and Marina Zueva in Canton, Michigan.

2010–2011 season: Injury and end of partnership 
In September 2010, Bates sustained a complete laceration of his Achilles tendon after Samuelson struck him with her skate blade as she came down from a lift. As a result, they missed the entire 2010–2011 season. In June 2011, it was reported that they had ended their partnership. On June 28, 2011, Samuelson and Bates confirmed their split and said they were both looking for new partners.

Chock and Bates

2011–2012 season: First season with Chock 
On July 1, 2011, Bates and Madison Chock announced their partnership and that they would continue to be coached by Shpilband and Zueva. They finished fourth at the 2011 Skate Canada International, fifth at the 2011 Trophée Éric Bompard, and 5th at the 2012 U.S. Championships. After Zueva and Shpilband ended their coaching partnership, Chock/Bates were the first team to announce that they would continue training with Shpilband.

2012–2013 season 
Chock/Bates finished fourth at the 2012 U.S. International Classic and then won gold at the 2012 Nebelhorn Trophy. They then competed at the 2012 Cup of China and finished fourth. At the 2013 U.S. Nationals, Chock/Bates were able to win the silver medal ahead of Shibutani/Shibutani. They were named in the U.S. team to the 2013 Four Continents, where they won the bronze medal. They finished seventh overall at the 2013 World Championships. Chock/Bates competed at the 2013 World Team Trophy and placed first in ice dance, helping Team USA win the team gold for the first time since 2009.

2013–2014 season: 2014 Olympics 
Chock/Bates were assigned to two Grand Prix events, the 2013 Cup of China and 2013 Rostelecom Cup, and won bronze at both. They won the silver medal at the 2014 U.S. Championships and were named in the U.S. Olympic team. They finished eighth at the 2014 Winter Olympics in Sochi, Russia.

Chock/Bates placed fourth in the short dance, fifth in the free, and fifth overall at the 2014 World Championships in Saitama, Japan.

2014–2015 season: World silver medal 
Chock/Bates took silver at the 2014 Nebelhorn Trophy, an ISU Challenger Series event, and then won both their Grand Prix events at the 2014 Skate America and 2014 Rostelecom Cup. The team went on to win the silver at the Grand Prix Final in December and then their first senior national title at the 2015 U.S. Championships in January.

In February, Chock/Bates won silver at the 2015 Four Continents Championships in Seoul, where they finished second to Canada's Weaver/Poje by a margin of 1.28 points. In March, they capped off their season with silver at the 2015 World Championships in Shanghai, China. Ranked first in the short dance and second in the free, they finished with a total score 2.94 points less than the champions, Papadakis/Cizeron of France, and 1.92 more than the bronze medalists, Weaver/Poje.

2015–2016 season: World bronze medal 
Chock/Bates won gold at the 2015 Nebelhorn Trophy, again an ISU Challenger Series event. At the event, they received comments that "Dark Eyes" was not suitable for a polka rhythm. They changed the short dance music to "More" and "Unchained Melody" to clarify the rhythms, and won the gold at the 2015 Skate America followed by a silver at 2015 Cup of China. They then won the silver medal at the 2015–16 Grand Prix Final in Barcelona, behind Canadians Weaver/Poje.

In March, Chock/Bates won the bronze medal at the 2016 World Championships in Boston, having finished third behind Papadakis/Cizeron and Shibutani/Shibutani in both segments.

2016–2017 season
Chock/Bates began their season with silver medals at four international events, the 2016 CS Nebelhorn Trophy, 2016 CS Ondrej Nepela Memorial, 2016 Skate Canada International, and 2016 Rostelecom Cup. In December, they placed sixth in the short dance, fourth in the free, and sixth overall at the Grand Prix Final in Marseille, France. In January, they ranked second in the short dance and first in the free dance at the 2017 U.S. Championships, losing overall to the Shibutanis by 1.01.

Chock/Bates took the bronze medal at the 2017 Four Continents Championships in Gangneung, South Korea, where they finished behind Canada's Virtue/Moir and the Shibutanis. They finished seventh overall (fourth in the short, eighth in the free) at the 2017 World Championships in Helsinki, Finland.

2017–2018 season: 2018 Olympics
Chock competed with an injury after bone fragments chipped off her right ankle in August 2017, just before Champs Camp. She and Bates won silver medals at the 2017 Cup of China and 2017 Internationaux de France, which meant that they qualified to their fourth consecutive Grand Prix Final. They placed fifth in the short dance, third in the free, and fifth overall at the December event in Nagoya, Japan.

At the 2018 U.S. Championships, Chock/Bates placed third in the short dance, first in the free dance, and third overall, scoring 0.52 less than the champions, Hubbell/Donohue, and 0.33 less than the Shibutanis. They were not selected for the team competition but competed in the individual ice dancing event at the 2018 Winter Olympics, which took place in February in Gangneung, South Korea. Chock reinjured her ankle in the final moments of the warm-up before the short dance. She stated that it was an "osteochondral lesion" with a loose bone fragment in her joint. The duo placed seventh in the short dance.  Skating their "Imagine" program in the free dance, the blades of their skates caught on the entrance of their combination spin, resulting in both falling and invalidating the entire element. They placed twelfth in the free dance and ninth overall.  Speaking afterward, Chock said that her previous injury was not responsible for the fall and that at that moment, "I knew it was over.  I knew there was no shot. After working so hard all this season and going through so much and trying to stay healthy and then just losing it at a crucial moment, it was really, really heartbreaking."

In March, they finished fifth at the 2018 World Championships in Milan, Italy. On April 6, 2018, Chock underwent surgery to remove the loose bone fragments in her right ankle. In late May, Chock/Bates announced a coaching change, stating that they would begin training in the summer with Marie-France Dubreuil, Patrice Lauzon, and Romain Haguenauer in Montreal, Quebec, Canada.

2018–2019 season: Four Continents gold
Chock and Bates were initially assigned to two Grand Prix events, the newly created Helsinki Grand Prix and the Rostelecom Cup.  Chock's recovery from her ankle surgery necessitated their withdrawal, and they did not compete in the first half of the season.

In January, they returned to competition at the Toruń Cup in Poland, winning decisively.  They then competed at the 2019 U.S. Championships in Detroit, where they placed second in both programs, winning the silver medal behind Hubbell/Donohue.  Both praised their new coaches and training environment afterward, with Bates saying they were "really happy with the performance here in Detroit. This self-belief is a belief in each other, our training mates, and coaches, and that is a strength that will carry us back to where we want to go."  They were assigned to compete at the Four Continents and World Championships.

At the Four Continents Championships, held in Anaheim, Chock/Bates placed second in the rhythm dance, again behind Hubbell/Donohue.  They placed first in the free dance and first overall, following a series of errors by Hubbell/Donohue, principally their planned stationary lift being reduced to base value after traveling too much.  This was the team's first gold medal at an ISU Championship, prompting Bates to observe, "we got a lot of medals, none of them are gold.  I am surprised. If you had told us that we would win Four Continents when we pulled out of the Grand Prix four months ago, I think we would be very surprised. But we’re very happy now."  Chock stated that she considered the placement secondary to "newfound joy and happiness" in their skating.

Chock/Bates concluded their season at the 2019 World Championships, where they finished sixth.

2019–2020 season: Second Four Continents and national titles
Beginning the season on the Challenger series, Chock/Bates won gold at the 2019 CS U.S. Classic, winning by almost 14 points over silver medalists Carreira/Ponomarenko.  At their second Challenger, the 2019 CS Finlandia Trophy, they won a second gold medal, despite the loss of an element in their free dance.

On the Grand Prix, Chock/Bates began at the 2019 Internationaux de France, where they placed second in the rhythm dance despite hitting only one of the four key points in the Finnstep pattern dance.  Second in the free dance, they also won the silver medal. The following week at the 2019 Cup of China, they again placed second in the rhythm dance and obtained only one of the four Finnstep key points.  Chock/Bates won the free dance decisively, but remained in second place overall. At the Grand Prix Final, Chock/Bates scored a season's best in the rhythm dance, placing third while obtaining three of the four Finnstep key points. They also scored a personal best in the free dance, finishing second in the free dance and second overall, returning to the Grand Prix Final podium for the first time since 2015.  Speaking afterward, Chock attributed much of their success to their Egyptian Snake Dance free program, saying, "there’s no other program like this in ice dance."

At the 2020 US Championships in Greensboro, Chock/Bates finished first in the rhythm dance, 1.02 points ahead of Hubbell/Donohue despite a slip in their Finnstep pattern. After the free dance, they were first overall, winning their second US title five years after their first one, which is the longest gap between ice dance titles in US history. They also won with the largest margin of victory in US ice dance since the Davis/White era, 4.67 points.

At the 2020 Four Continents Championships in Seoul, Chock/Bates finished second in the rhythm dance with a personal best score of 85.76, just 0.2 points behind Hubbell/Donohue. In the free dance, Chock/Bates finished first despite falling on a transition. They successfully defended their Four Continents title, becoming the first ice dance couple to do so since Belbin/Agosto from 2004 to 2006.  Chock/Bates were assigned to compete at the World Championships in Montreal, but these were canceled as a result of the coronavirus pandemic.

2020–2021 season
Chock and Bates remained in Montreal during the pandemic and were off-ice for three months before the rink reopened for training. The duo lost a month of training to an injury to Chock. She suffered a concussion after fainting after a walk on a hot day in July. They spent another two weeks in quarantine due to COVID-19 exposure, though neither tested positive.  As a result, they abandoned plans to use a new free dance for the season and withdrew from the 2020 Skate America.

At the 2021 U.S. Championships, Chock/Bates finished first in the rhythm dance, 0.44 points ahead of Hubbell/Donohue despite Chock losing a twizzle level.  In the free dance, Bates stepped out of his twizzles, resulting in them finishing second in the free dance and overall.  They were named to the US team for the 2021 World Championships in Stockholm where they finished fourth in the competition.

The Stockholm World Championships were held without an audience due to the pandemic, with Chock/Bates' training partners and four-time World Champions Papadakis/Cizeron declining to attend due to their own COVID illness and lost training time. This led to a hotly contested podium, generally seen as being between six teams, them included.  Chock/Bates placed third in the rhythm dance, narrowly behind Hubbell/Donohue in second and over two points ahead of Canada's Gilles/Poirier in fourth. Bates lost a twizzle level in the free dance.  They placed fourth in that segment, dropping to fourth place overall behind Gilles/Poirier in third. Their fourth place combined with Hubbell/Donohue's second qualified three berths for American dance teams at the 2022 Winter Olympics.

2021–2022 season: 2022 Olympics and third national title
The team selected a medley of Billie Eilish songs to perform for their rhythm dance while, following the success of their Egyptian Snake Dance program, aimed to replicate that success with a new "Contact" program built around the concept of an astronaut romancing an alien, accompanied by a medley from Daft Punk's final album, Random Access Memories. Making their season debut at the 2021 CS Finlandia Trophy, Chock/Bates won the silver medal behind training mates Papadakis/Cizeron.

On the Grand Prix, Chock/Bates competed first at the 2021 Skate America, also attended by primary domestic rivals Hubbell/Donohue. Placing second in both programs, they won the silver medal after finishing 1.31 points behind Hubbell/Donohue. At their second event, the 2021 NHK Trophy, Chock/Bates placed narrowly second in the rhythm dance, only 0.31 points behind reigning World champions Sinitsina/Katsalapov. Bates fell right at the beginning of the free dance, though not on an element, and they remained in second place. Assessing the error, Bates said afterward, "we responded well and put together a good performance considering the early mishap." Their results qualified them to the Grand Prix Final, but it was subsequently canceled due to restrictions prompted by the Omicron variant.

At the 2022 U.S. Championships, Chock/Bates placed first in the rhythm dance, leading by 2.55 points over Hubbell/Donohue. They placed second in the free dance but won overall by 1.78 points due to their lead in the rhythm dance. They were named to the American Olympic team, the third such for Chock and fourth for Bates. Bates became the first U.S. skater of any discipline to compete in four Winter Olympics.

Chock/Bates began the 2022 Winter Olympics as the American entries in the free dance segment of the Olympic team event. At the time they took the ice, a fifth-place finish in the pairs free segment by Knierim/Frazier had raised the possibility of the second-place American team dropping to third behind Team Japan. However, Chock/Bates would unexpectedly win the segment over Russian entries Sinitsina/Katsalapov, securing America's position over Japan. The American team ultimately won the silver medal, the first Olympic medal for both Chock and Bates. In the dance event days later, Chock stumbled midway through the performance, and they finished fourth in the segment. Bates admitted to having "mixed feelings" about the performance," but said, "it's not over yet." Fourth in the free dance, they finished fourth overall. Bates said after: "I think the fourth place sometimes can be one of the hardest places to finish. But the fact that there are only three spots on the podium is what makes this sport so furious and so loved by so many people and the fans at home and the athletes too. We want the competition to be strong and deep, and that’s exactly what it is."

Chock and Bates concluded the season at the 2022 World Championships, held in Montpellier. Russian dance teams were absent due to the International Skating Union banning all Russian athletes due to their country's invasion of Ukraine. Chock/Bates were third in the rhythm dance with a personal best 87.51 score. Third as well in the free dance, they took the bronze medal returning to the World podium for the first time in six years. With Papadakis/Cizeron taking the gold medal and Hubbell/Donohue the silver, the entire podium consisted of skaters from the Ice Academy of Montreal. Chock said, "it was a dream to be able to share that podium with our training mates and to be back on the podium after what feels like a very, very long time."

2022–2023 season
With another Olympic cycle, the two faced questions about retirement, to which Bates responded, "these are the most enjoyable years of our career. We're not ready to step away from competitive ice just yet." With Hubbell/Donohue retired and Papadakis/Cizeron sitting out at least the season, the two entered the 2022–23 season perceived as favorites for the World title; Chock called this "a big goal of ours, and it always has been." The two toured for three months following the Montpellier World Championships, performing in forty skating shows, and as a result, were not prepared in time to participate in a Challenger event.

For their free dance for the new season, they opted for a medley of songs by Quebec musician Jorane and a program theme inspired by Chock's vintage 1920 engagement ring, namely, "how love is connected and flows through time and transcends the physical world." In their competitive debut on the Grand Prix at the 2022 Skate America, they won the gold medal, albeit losing the free dance to domestic rivals Hawayek/Baker after their choreographic slide element was invalidated. This was their first Grand Prix gold since 2015. Following Skate America, significant alterations were made to their free dance, incorporating the music "Souffrance" by Orange Blossom while also "evolving" the concept to be "about the relationship of the spirit of fire and spirit of air and how one cannot survive without each other." They were generally considered the favorites to win the 2022 NHK Trophy, their second event, but they unexpectedly finished second behind Canadian training partners Fournier Beaudry/Sørensen, taking the silver medal. Chock acknowledged the expectations, saying, "we discussed what the season will look like for ourselves, and I think each season always offers new adversity and new obstacles. And this season is no different. Our goal remains the same: we want to win Worlds this year."

Entering the Grand Prix Final in Turin perceived to be on the back foot against top-seeded Canadians Gilles/Poirier and Italian champions Guignard/Fabbri. However, they performed well in the rhythm dance, finishing in second place and only 0.44 points behind Gilles/Poirier. Chock remarked, "based on how the season has been so far, we are just really proud of how much work we accomplished in such a short amount of time." They were second in the free dance as well, finishing 3.70 points behind Gilles/Poirier and winning their fourth Grand Prix Final silver, which Chock called "everything we hoped it would be for where we have been and the amount of work we’ve put in since Skate America and NHK."

Heavy favourites going into the 2023 U.S. Championships, Chock/Bates successfully defended their title, winning a second consecutive and fourth overall national gold medal together.

With rivals Gilles/Poirier absent from the 2023 Four Continents Championships due to Gilles' requiring an appendectomy, Chock/Bates entered the event as heavy favourites for their third title. They won the rhythm dance with a personal best 87.67, albeit with second-place Fournier Beaudry/Sørensen unexpectedly close behind with 86.28. They won the free dance by a wider margin of over five points, taking the gold medal again and setting new personal bests in the segment and overall. Bates reflected on their victories at Four Continents, saying "the first time we were very surprised we won. The second time we won, we didn't skate our best. And today, I think, was the right mix of feeling really prepared, skating really well, and still being surprised."

Programs

With Chock

With Samuelson

Competitive highlights 
GP: Grand Prix; CS: Challenger Series; JGP: Junior Grand Prix

With Chock

With Samuelson

Detailed results

With Chock

References

External links 

 
 
 
 

1989 births
Living people
American male ice dancers
World Figure Skating Championships medalists
Four Continents Figure Skating Championships medalists
World Junior Figure Skating Championships medalists
Figure skaters at the 2010 Winter Olympics
Figure skaters at the 2014 Winter Olympics
Figure skaters at the 2018 Winter Olympics
Figure skaters at the 2022 Winter Olympics
Olympic silver medalists for the United States in figure skating
Medalists at the 2022 Winter Olympics
Season-end world number one figure skaters
Season's world number one figure skaters
Sportspeople from Ann Arbor, Michigan
University of Michigan alumni